The Battle of the Malacca Strait, sometimes called the Sinking of Haguro, and in Japanese sources as the Battle off Penang (ペナン沖海戦), was a naval battle that resulted from the British search-and-destroy operation in May 1945, called Operation Dukedom, that resulted in the sinking of the Japanese cruiser . Haguro had been operating as a supply ship for Japanese garrisons in the Dutch East Indies and the Bay of Bengal since 1 May 1945.

Background
On 9 May, Haguro left Singapore, escorted by the destroyer , to evacuate the Japanese garrison in the Andaman Islands located in Port Blair back to Singapore. Force 61 of the Eastern Fleet set sail on 10 May from Trincomalee, Ceylon, to intercept the Japanese flotilla. The Japanese were unwilling to risk any battle and, on receipt of an air reconnaissance warning, they returned to Singapore.

On 14 May, Haguro and Kamikaze tried again and left Singapore. The next day, they were spotted by aircraft from Force 61. The subsequent bombing attack by Grumman Avenger IIs of 851 Naval Air Squadron caused only minor damage to Haguro, for the loss of an aircraft whose crew was taken prisoner by the Japanese.

Battle
Information was relayed to the Japanese that two British destroyer squadrons had been sighted heading towards them. Again, they reversed course to return to the Malacca Strait. This change had been anticipated, however, and the 26th Destroyer Flotilla,  under Captain Manley Power, steamed to intercept.

The British destroyers arranged themselves in a crescent cordon and allowed the Japanese ships to sail into the trap.

At 01:05, Venus, parallel to Haguro as she raced past the north-westernmost ship in Power's force, found herself in a perfect attacking position. But the Torpedo Control Officer aboard Venus had made the wrong angle settings on her eight tubes, the opportunity was lost and Venus heeled hard over to port to clear the target area but still maintain the encirclement. Haguro, thinking Venus had launched torpedoes, altered course away to comb the tracks. In so doing, she turned south and deeper into the trap.

Saumarez and Verulam were now well positioned to make their attacks. Haguro appeared fine off Saumarezs port bow at a range of 6,000 yards (3.4 miles), each ship closing at 30 knots. At the same time, the Japanese destroyer Kamikaze appeared off the starboard bow, crossing from starboard to port, only 3,000 yards away and on a collision course. Saumarez's second salvo from her two forward, radar-controlled 4.7in guns struck Kamikaze and 40mm Bofors shells from the British ship's aft twin-mounting ripped the 320ft length of the Japanese destroyer as Saumarez heeled to starboard. Haguro now fired her first broadside of ten 8in and four 5in guns at Saumarez. Tremendous waterspouts thrown up alongside swamped the British flotilla leader's upper decks as Haguro was seen clearly three miles away in the light of both sides' star-shells.

At 01:11, just as she was about to fire torpedoes, Saumarez was hit. The top of her funnel disappeared over the side and a 5in shell penetrated No. 1 Boiler Room, severed a steam main and lodged inside the boiler. Five men were scalded, two of whom died, but as with the 8in shell hits, this shell failed to explode at such close range and was later thrown overboard.

At 01:15, Haguro was hit by three torpedoes from Saumarez and Verulam. As Saumarez limped northward from the immediate battle area, a violent explosion created confusion. Power thought it was Kamikaze blowing up and men on Virago and Vigilant thought it was Saumarez, but it was probably two torpedoes colliding. Another possibility would be a Japanese torpedo, which had a much larger warhead than allied torpedoes, exploding in the wake of a ship.  Morrison records at least two such episodes earlier in the war. Venus hit Haguro with one torpedo at 01:25, and Virago stopped Haguro with two more torpedo hits two minutes later. The Japanese cruiser finally sank at 02:06 after receiving another torpedo from Vigilant, two more from Venus, and nearly an hour of gunfire from the 26th Flotilla.

Saumarezs main aerial and a funnel top had been shot away, and an  shell nicked the forecastle. Two men were killed and three burned in the boiler room when a  shell severed the main steam pipe. There was no damage to the remainder of the 26th Flotilla.

Aftermath
Kamikaze was also damaged, but escaped, returning the next day to rescue survivors. About 320 survived, but over 900 died, including the Japanese commanders, Vice-Admiral Hashimoto and Rear-Admiral Sugiura.

This was one of the last major surface gun and torpedo actions of World War II. Lord Louis Mountbatten, himself a distinguished destroyer captain, described it in his Report to the Combined Chiefs of Staff (CCS) as 'an outstanding example of a night attack by destroyers.'

Shipwreck
The wreck was discovered sitting upright in 2003 and partially explored by a group of specialised shipwreck divers aboard MV Empress. In 2010 another diving expedition, also aboard MV Empress, surveyed the wreck in detail.
In 2014, the wreck was ravaged by illegal salvagers for scrap metal.

Notes

References

 
 
 
 
 
 
  – Firsthand account of the battle by a member of HMS Vigilants crew.
 
 
 I Was There! - We Settled a Jap Cruiser in Malacca Straits, The War Illustrated, August 17, 1945. – Firsthand account of the battle by members of HMS Venuss crew.

the Malacca Strait
1945 in British Malaya
Malacca
Malacca Strait
Malacca
Strait of Malacca
the Malacca Strait